Eucyclotoma carinulata is a species of sea snail, a marine gastropod mollusk in the family Raphitomidae.

Description
The length of the shell attains 8 mm.

The shell is longitudinally obscurely ribbed, and transversely striated. The ribs disappear towards the base, where the striae become 
stronger. The body whorl is tricarinate, those of the spire bicarinate. The carinae are nodulous. The color of the shell is whitish, maculated with yellowish chestnut.

Distribution
THis marine species occurs off New Caledonia

References

 Souverbie, M. (1875) Descriptions d'espèces nouvelles de l'Archipel Calédonien. Journal de Conchyliologie, 23, 282–296.

External links
 

carinulata
Gastropods described in 1875